Get to Me may refer to:

Get to Me (Unspoken EP)
Get to Me (Train EP)
Get to Me (Train song) 2005
"Get To Me", a 1978 song by Luther Ingram
"Get to Me", a song by Lady Antebellum from Golden